This Happening is an album by pianist Jaki Byard and multi-instrumentalist Michael Marcus.

Background
This was Marcus's second album for Justin Time Records.

Recording and music
Of the nine tracks, seven are originals. Marcus mostly plays saxello and stritch (types of straight saxophone) on the album. On the "Giant Steps" and "Naima" medley, he plays bass clarinet.

Release
The album was released by Justin Time on June 10, 1997.

Reception
The AllMusic reviewer commented that Byard had a largely supporting role, so "although this CD will probably be quite important in the discography of Michael Marcus, it is just a footnote, a lost opportunity, in Jaki Byard's career." The JazzTimes reviewer praised Marcus's tone on the rarely played saxophones.

Track listing
"Earth Beings / 3=4" – 5:58
"This Happening" – 6:05
"Kelso Tracks South" – 4:00
"Giant Steps / Naima" – 6:27
"Steppin' Down with Jaki" – 6:50
"The Cry for Peace" – 5:32
"The Continuum" – 4:29
"Kelso Tracks North" – 3:14
"Darn That Dream" – 6:41

Personnel
 Jaki Byard – piano
 Michael Marcus – saxello, stritch, bass clarinet

References

1997 albums
Jaki Byard albums
Justin Time Records albums